Annebjerggaard, also known as Anneberg, is a former manor house situated on the southern outskirts of Nykøbing Sjælland, Odsherred Municipality, some 90 km northwest of Copenhagen, Denmark. It is now operated as a cultural centre. The building is currently home to the administration of Odsherred Museum. In 2020, Odsherred Museum

History

17th century
Annebjerggaard was established by merchant and royal treasurer Henrik Müller in around 1660. The land had previously belonged to a village called Mosby. He named it after his daughter, Anna Cathrine, whom he subsequently presented it to. )n 1686, Müller was convicted of embezzlement against the crown. As a result of economic difficulties, he had to ytansger Annebjerggaard to Manuel Texeira.

Manuel Texeira left Annebjerggaard to his son Samuel Texeira. In 1692, he sold Annebjerggaard Gunde Vossbein. In 1694, he also acquired nearby Ellingegaard. The two estate were the same year both granted the status of manors.This status required copyholds with a total area of 200 tønder hartkorn and resulted in freedom from taxes and other privileges.

18th century
In 1705, Annebjerggaard was acquired by Christian Wildenradt. He was the following year married to Vibeke Margrethe Weldingh. She was after his death in  1723 married to her children's tutor Peder Svane. The couple had a daughter, Ulrikke Eleonore Svane, who was allegedly the result of the mother's relationship with Frederik IV (1671-1730), who had visited Annebjerggaard.

Ulrikke Eleonore Svane married Niels Christian Bang, 27 years her senior, who served as manager of the crown land in Odsherred. Ulrikke Eleonore Svane was upon her husband's death in 1760 married to his successor, Jakob Hansen, who in 1760 bought Annebjerggaard as well as the churches in Vig and Rørvig.

In 1770, Hansen sold Annebjerggaard to Henrik Rosted, who a few years later sold it to Christian VII (1749-1808). Hansen's son-in-law, Frants Wilhelm Trojel, was subsequently appointed as the new manager of the crown land in Odsherred. In 1801, he purchased Annebjerggaard. For the first time since 1694,  Annebjerggaard and Ellingegaard were therefore no longer in the hands of the same owner. Henrik Steffens, who was a descendent of Annebjerggaard's former owner, Niels Christian Bang, served briefly as tutor for Frants Wilhelm Trojel's children.

18th century

In 1814, Annabjerggaard was acquired by Frederik von Buchwald. He improved the management of the estate through the introduction of new cultivation methods. He also established a small shipyard on the estate. In 1852, he constructed a new main building to designs by the architect Theodor Sørensen. Christian VIII (1786-1848) visited him several times. The estate was upon his death in 1874 passed to his daughter Charlotte Buchwald.

20th century
Annabjerggaard changed hands a number of times during ]]Workd War One]]. Part of the land. Part of the land was used for the construction of the new Nykøbing Psychiatric Hospital. In 1916, E. H. Steenberg sold Buchwald's old main building from 1852. The old home farm (avlsgård) from 1778 was instead adapted for use as a new main building.

In 1947, J. C. Hempel purchased the remainder of the estate. In 1952, he constructed a new main building to his own design.In 1953, he also constructed a cultural centre on a hilltop behind the main building. This building was designed by the architect A. P. Birkedal. The estate was after Hempel's death passed to his son Peter. In 1985, it was acquired by Hans Tandrup.

In 2000, Annebjerggaard changed hands again when it was acquired by the local Trundholm Municipality (now part of Odsherred Municipality). In 2003, it was ceded to Odsherred Museum. In 2020, Odsherred Museum put the building up for sale.

List of owners
 (1660- ) Henrik Müller
 ( -1688) Anna Cathrine Müller, gift Bartholin
 (1688- ) Manuel Texeira
 ( -1692) Samuel Texeira
 (1692-1697) Gunde Vossbein
 (1697-1705) Hans Leegaard
 (1705-1724) Christian Wildenradt
 (1724- ) Peder Svane
 ( -1760) Niels Christian Bang
 (1760) Ulrikke Eleonore Svane gift, 1) Bang 2) Hansen
 (1760-1770) Jakob Hansen
 (1770-1776) Henrik Rosted
 (1776-1801) Kronen
 (1801-1810) Frants Wilhelm Trojel
 (1810- ) Lorenz Fribert
 ( -1814) Ulrikke Eleonore Fribert
 (1814-1828) Frederik von Buchwald
 (1828- ) Ulrikke Eleonore Fribert
 ( -1874) Frederik von Buchwald
 (1874-1897) Charlotte Buchwald
 (1897-1913) Christian Frederik Ferdinand von Holstein
 (1913- ) H. H. Rehling-Quistgaard
 ( -1916) T. Abben
 (1916-1932) E. H. Steenberg
 (1932-1947) C. Christfort
 (1947-1970) J. C. Hempel
 (1970-1985) Peter Hempel
 (1985-2000) Hans Tandrup
 (2000-2003) Trundholm Kommune
 (2003- ) Odsherreds Kulturhistoriske Museum

References

External links
 Trojel

Buildings and structures in Odsherred Municipality
Houses completed in 1862

da:Anneberg